{{DISPLAYTITLE:C4H4O3}}
The molecular formula C4H4O3 (molar mass: 100.07 g/mol) may refer to:

 5-Hydroxy-2(5H)-furanone
 Succinic anhydride
 Tetronic acid

Molecular formulas